The Phantom 14, also called the Phantom 14', is an Italian catamaran sailing dinghy that was first built in 1995.

Production
The design has been built by Centro Nautico Adriatico in Italy since 1995 and remains in production.

Design
The Phantom 14 is a recreational sailboat, built predominantly of glassfibre, with a foam core. It has a stayed catboat rig or sloop rig with the additional of the optional jib. It has a rotating, watertight anodized aluminum mast and full battened Dacron mainsail. The hulls have raked stems, vertical transoms, transom-hung, kick-up rudders controlled by a tiller and retractable kick-up centreboards. The boat displaces .

A two-piece mast is available to facilitate ground transport and storage.

The boat can be sailed with one or two people.

See also
List of sailing boat types
List of multihulls

Similar sailboats
DC‐14 Phantom - a boat with a similar name
Phantom (dinghy) - a 14.50 foot catboat with a similar name
Phantom 14 - a 14 foot Lateen-rigged sailboat with the same name
Phantom 16 (catamaran) - a boat with a similar name

References

External links

1990s sailboat type designs
Catamarans
Sailboat types built by Centro Nautico Adriatico